Eugen Siebecke was a German politician and member of the SPD. He was the mayor of Marburg from 6 April 1945 until 5 February 1946.

References 

Year of birth unknown
20th-century deaths
Mayors of Marburg
Social Democratic Party of Germany politicians